Andreas Lübke (born 12 March 1967) is a retired German football forward.

References

External links
 
 

1967 births
Living people
German footballers
Bundesliga players
Stuttgarter Kickers players
VfL Bochum players
Association football forwards